Leicester East is a  constituency represented in the House of Commons of the UK Parliament since December 2019 by Claudia Webbe, who was elected as a Labour MP, but now sits as an Independent due to her suspension and subsequent expulsion from the party in November 2021 after she was convicted of harassment.

Boundaries 

1918–1950: The County Borough of Leicester wards of Belgrave, Latimer, Spinney Hill, and West Humberstone.

1974–1983: The County Borough of Leicester wards of Belgrave, Charnwood, Evington, Humberstone, and Latimer.

1983–2010: The City of Leicester wards of Belgrave, Charnwood, Coleman, Evington, Humberstone, Latimer, Rushey Mead, Thurncourt, and West Humberstone.

2010–present: The City of Leicester wards of Belgrave, Charnwood, Coleman, Evington, Humberstone & Hamilton, Latimer, Rushey Mead, and Thurncourt.

2015–present: The City of Leicester wards of Belgrave, Rushey Mead, Troon, North Evington, Evington, Humberstone & Hamilton and Thurncourt.

The newly created Troon Ward replaced the old Charnwood Ward covering the Northfields Estate and the adjacent Industrial Estate Area to the north, of which it takes its name.

Constituency profile 
This is an urban seat in the commercial and engineering centre of Leicester. The seat excludes the heart of the city centre, skirting its tightly planned ring road. A golf course is situated in the southeast and a large municipal garden in the northwest of the boundaries.

Leicester East has an extremely high South Asian population. In the 2011 census, two-thirds of the population were non-white and 48.5% of people described themselves as Asian. Almost a third of the population are Hindu and the majority of others of Asian ethnicity are of Muslim or Sikh faiths. Those of mixed ethnicities are gradually increasing — to 3.1% of the population in 2011.

The bulk of the eastern outskirts are relatively compact and much of the remainder of the county by the 21st century has become transformed economically into a retirement and commuter belt for the city and its railway links. The division's south-west quarter is within normal walking distance of all parts of Leicester City Centre and the seat is served by buses and cycle routes into the city centre.

History

First creation
The seat was created in 1918 and for the next four years was served by Sir Gordon Hewart KC, resigning to become Lord Chief Justice of England and Wales. In 1950 the area was divided between Leicester North East and Leicester South East, which also covered part of the present Charnwood seat and Rutland and Melton.

Second creation, current creation
In 1974 the seat was recreated.

Summary of results
Leicester East has been won by the Labour Party's candidate in 10 of 11 elections since its recreation.  Its MP, Keith Vaz, had won an absolute majority (plurality) of votes since the 1992 general election. The 2015 result made the seat the 37-safest of Labour's 232 seats by percentage of majority. Leicester East was narrowly won by Conservative candidate Peter Bruinvels at the height of the Tory party's popularity in 1983; the following election saw Labour's Keith Vaz regain the seat; he had held it at every election thereafter, and since 1992 had always won by margins of over 20% and 11,000 votes until standing down at the 2019 general election. Vaz won his highest majority ever, 22,428 votes (42.8%), in 2017. In 2019 Labour held the seat with a substantially reduced majority of 6,019, down from 22,428 - a swing of 15%.

Opposition parties
The candidate fielded by the Conservative Party has been runner-up in every election save for Bruinvels' win in 1983. The candidate of UKIP for the first time took third place in 2015, her 2010 counterpart having won 1.5% of the vote and the party not having stood before. The pro-UKIP swing between 2010 and 2015 elections, of 7.4%, was less than the national average of 9.5%. Susan Cooper was 1.8% away from second place in 2005, giving the best result of a Liberal Democrat to date, attracting just under one fifth of the vote.

Turnout
Turnout in the recreated seat has ranged between 78.7% in 1992 to 62.1% in 2001.

Members of Parliament

Elections

Elections in the 2010s

Elections in the 2000s 

In 2005 this seat bucked the national trend as there was a swing to Labour whereas the national swing was 2.5% to the Conservatives.

Elections in the 1990s

Elections in the 1980s

Elections in the 1970s

Elections in the 1940s

Elections in the 1930s

Elections in the 1920s

Election in the 1910s

See also 
 List of parliamentary constituencies in Leicestershire and Rutland

Notes

References

Parliamentary constituencies in Leicestershire
Constituencies of the Parliament of the United Kingdom established in 1918
Constituencies of the Parliament of the United Kingdom disestablished in 1950
Constituencies of the Parliament of the United Kingdom established in 1974
Politics of Leicester